Saint-Irénée is a municipality in the Capitale-Nationale region of Quebec, Canada.

Demographics

Population

Private dwellings occupied by usual residents: 300 (total dwellings: 460)

Language
Mother tongue:
 English as first language: 0%
 French as first language: 100%
 English and French as first language: 0%
 Other as first language: 0%

Notable people

 Thérèse Casgrain (1896-1981), senator

See also
 Charlevoix-Est Regional County Municipality
 Charlevoix tourist train
 Domaine Forget, an international education institution in music and dance
 Jean-Noël River
 Rivière Jean-Noël Nord-Est
 Saint Lawrence River
 List of municipalities in Quebec

References

Municipalities in Quebec
Incorporated places in Capitale-Nationale